Ed Benedict Park is a  public park in Portland, Oregon's Lents neighborhood, in the United States. The park was acquired in 1988 and features a skate plaza. The park's Portland Memory Garden was dedicated in 2002.

References

External links

 

1988 establishments in Oregon
Lents, Portland, Oregon
Parks in Portland, Oregon